The  World Junior Chess Championship is an under-20 chess tournament (players must have been under 20 years old on 1 January in the year of competition) organized by the World Chess Federation (FIDE).

The idea was the brainchild of William Ritson-Morry, who organized the 1951 inaugural event to take place in Birmingham, England. Subsequently, it was held every two years until 1973, when an annual schedule was adopted. In 1983, a separate tournament for girls was established.

Each FIDE member nation may select one entrant except for the host nation, which may select two. Some players are seeded into the tournament based on Elo rating and top finishes in previous championships. The first championship was an 11-round Swiss system tournament. In subsequent championships, the entrants were divided into sections, and preliminary sectional tournaments were used to establish graded finals sections (Final A, Final B, etc.). Since 1975 the tournaments have returned to the Swiss format.

Originally the winner was awarded the title International Master if he had not already received it.
Currently the winner receives the Grandmaster or Woman Grandmaster title, and the second and third-place finishers receive the International Master or Woman International Master titles .

Four winners – Boris Spassky, Anatoly Karpov, Garry Kasparov and Viswanathan Anand – have gone on to win the World Chess Championship.

World U-20 Championship

{| class="sortable wikitable"
! No. !! Year !! Location !! Champion !! Winning country
|-
| 1
| 1951
| Coventry/Birmingham
| 
| 
|-
| 2
| 1953
| Copenhagen
| 
| 
|-
| 3
| 1955
| Antwerp
| 
| 
|-
| 4
| 1957
| Toronto
| 
| 
|-
| 5
| 1959
| Münchenstein
| 
| 
|-
| 6
| 1961
| The Hague
| 
| 
|-
| 7
| 1963
| Vrnjačka Banja
| 
| 
|-
| 8
| 1965
| Barcelona
| 
| 
|-
| 9
| 1967
| Jerusalem
| 
| 
|-
| 10
| 1969
| Stockholm
| 
| 
|-
| 11
| 1971
| Athens
| 
| 
|-
| 12
| 1973
| Teesside
| 
| 
|-
| 13
| 1974
| Manila
| 
| 
|-
| 14
| 1975
| Tjentište
| 
| 
|-
| 15
| 1976
| Groningen
| 
| 
|-
| 16
| 1977
| Innsbruck
| 
| 
|-
| 17
| 1978
| Graz
| 
| 
|-
| 18
| 1979
| Skien
| 
| 
|-
| 19
| 1980
| Dortmund
| 
| 
|-
| 20
| 1981
| Mexico City
| 
| 
|-
| 21
| 1982
| Copenhagen
| 
| 
|-
| 22
| 1983
| Belfort
| 
|  
|-
| 23
| 1984
| Kiljava
| 
| 
|-
| 24
| 1985
| Sharjah
| 
| 
|-
| 25
| 1986
| Gausdal
| 
| 
|-
| 26
| 1987
| Baguio
| 
| 
|-
| 27
| 1988
| Adelaide
| 
| 
|-
| 28
| 1989
| Tunja
| 
|  
|-
| 29
| 1990
| Santiago
| 
| 
|-
| 30
| 1991
| Mamaja
| 
| 
|-
| 31
| 1992
| Buenos Aires
| 
| 
|-
| 32
| 1993
| Kozhikode
| 
| 
|-
| 33
| 1994
| Matinhos
| 
| 
|-
| 34
| 1995
| Halle
| 
| 
|-
| 35
| 1996
| Medellín
| 
| 
|-
| 36
| 1997
| Żagań
| 
| 
|-
| 37
| 1998
| Kozhikode
| 
| 
|-
| 38
| 1999
| Yerevan
| 
| 
|-
| 39
| 2000
| Yerevan
| 
| 
|-
| 40
| 2001
| Athens
| 
| 
|-
| 41
| 2002
| Goa
| 
| 
|-
| 42
| 2003
| Nakhchivan
| 
| 
|-
| 43
| 2004
| Kochi
| 
| 
|-
| 44
| 2005
| Istanbul
| 
| 
|-
| 45
| 2006
| Yerevan
| 
| 
|-
| 46
| 2007
| Yerevan
| 
| 
|-
| 47
| 2008
| Gaziantep
| 
| 
|-
| 48
| 2009
| Puerto Madryn
| 
| 
|-
| 49
| 2010
| Chotowa
| 
| 
|-
| 50
| 2011
| Chennai
| 
| 
|-
| 51
| 2012
| Athens
| 
| 
|-
| 52
| 2013
| Kocaeli
| 
| 
|- 
| 53
| 2014
| Pune
| 
|  
|- 
| 54
| 2015
| Khanty-Mansiysk
|  
| 
|-
| 55
| 2016
| Bhubaneswar
| 
| 
|-
| 56
| 2017
| Tarvisio
| 
| 
|-
| 57
| 2018
| Gebze
| 
| 
|-
| 58
| 2019
| New Delhi
|  
|  
|-
| 59
| 2022
| Cala Gonone
| 
| 
|}

World Girls U-20 Championship

{| class="sortable wikitable"
! No. !! Year !! Location !! Champion !! Winning country
|-
| 1
| 1982
| Senta
| 
| 
|-
| 2
| 1983
| Mexico City
| 
| 
|-
| 3
| 1985
| Dobrna
| 
| 
|-
| 4
| 1986
| Vilnius
| 
| 
|-
| 5
| 1987
| Baguio
| 
| 
|-
| 6
| 1988
| Adelaide
| 
| 
|-
| 7
| 1989
| Tunja
| 
| 
|-
| 8
| 1990
| Santiago
| 
| 
|-
| 9
| 1991
| Mamaja
| 
| 
|-
| 10
| 1992
| Buenos Aires
| 
| 
|-
| 11
| 1993
| Kozhikode
| 
| 
|-
| 12
| 1994
| Matinhos
| 
| 
|-
| 13
| 1995
| Halle
| 
| 
|-
| 14
| 1996
| Medellín
| 
| 
|-
| 15
| 1997
| Żagań
| 
| 
|-
| 16
| 1998
| Kozhikode
| 
| 
|-
| 17
| 1999
| Yerevan
| 
| 
|-
| 18
| 2000
| Yerevan
| 
| 
|-
| 19
| 2001
| Athens
| 
| 
|-
| 20
| 2002
| Goa
| 
| 
|-
| 21
| 2003
| Nakhchivan
| 
| 
|-
| 22
| 2004
| Kochi
| 
| 
|-
| 23
| 2005
| Istanbul
| 
| 
|-
| 24
| 2006
| Yerevan
| 
| 
|-
| 25
| 2007
| Yerevan
| 
| 
|-
| 26
| 2008
| Gaziantep
| 
| 
|-
| 27
| 2009
| Puerto Madryn
| 
| 
|-
| 28
| 2010
| Chotowa
| 
| 
|-
| 29
| 2011
| Chennai
| 
| 
|-
| 30
| 2012
| Athens
| 
| 
|-
| 31
| 2013
| Kocaeli
| 
| 
|-
| 32
| 2014
| Pune
| 
| 
|-
| 33
| 2015
| Khanty-Mansiysk
| 
| 
|-
| 34
| 2016
| Bhubaneswar
| 
| 
|-
| 35
| 2017
| Tarvisio
| 
| 
|-
| 36
| 2018
| Gebze
| 
| 
|-
| 37
| 2019
| New Delhi
| 
| 
|-
| 38
| 2022
| Cala Gonone
| 
| 
|}

Medal table
As of 2019 (58 Men + 37 Women)

Details by year

The main source of reference is indicated beneath each year's entry.

1951 – Coventry and Birmingham, England – (July) – Eighteen players played an 11-round Swiss-system tournament. Borislav Ivkov dominated the tournament with an undefeated 9.5-1.5, 1.5 points ahead of the second-place finisher. Also-rans included future leading grandmasters Bent Larsen (6.5–4.5) and Friðrik Ólafsson (5.5–5.5).

Boys U-20 – 1. Borislav Ivkov (YUG) 2. Malcolm Barker (ENG) 3. R. Cruz (ARG)

 --- Kažić, B.M., International Championship Chess: A Complete Record of FIDE Events, Pitman Publishing, 1974, pp. 269–70. .

1953 – Copenhagen, Denmark – (July) – Twenty players began play in each of two sections, with the top four from each section advancing to the championship final. Oscar Panno and Klaus Darga tied for first in the final with undefeated 5.5-1.5 scores, with Panno taking the title on Sonneborn–Berger points. Former champion Ivkov and Olafsson tied for third and fourth place with even scores, with Ivkov finishing third on tiebreak. Larsen tied for fifth-eighth place with the remaining players at 2.5–4.5, finishing last of the eight finalists on tiebreak.

Boys U-20 – 1. Oscar Panno (ARG) 2. Klaus Darga (FRG) 3. Borislav Ivkov (YUG)

 --- Kažić, B.M., International Championship Chess: A Complete Record of FIDE Events, Pitman Publishing, 1974, pp. 270–71. .

1955 – Antwerp, Belgium – (July) – There were 24 players in total, comprising an original entry of 23, plus an additional player from the home country to make a more manageable number. The competitors were split into three groups of eight; the representatives of USSR, Argentina and Yugoslavia (the top three teams at the 1954 Olympiad) were seeded into separate groups, and the remainder allocated their group randomly. The top three finishers of each group plus the highest scoring fourth place then went forward to a final ten player all-play-all contest. Surprise casualties at the group stage were John Purdy (Australia) and Ciric (YUG). In the final, future world champion Boris Spassky gave up just two draws to score 8–1, the also-undefeated Edmar Mednis scored 7–2, and Miguel Farre of Spain scored 6.5–2.5. Future grandmasters Lajos Portisch (HUN) (5.5–3.5) and Georgi Tringov (BUL) (5–4) finished fourth and fifth.

Boys U-20 – 1. Boris Spassky (USSR) 2. Edmar Mednis (USA) 3. Miguel Farré (ESP)

 --- British Chess Magazine No. 9, Vol. 75 pp. 262–65; Kažić, B.M., International Championship Chess: A Complete Record of FIDE Events, Pitman Publishing, 1974, p. 272. .

1957 – Toronto, Canada – (August) – Only twelve players from eleven countries competed in a round-robin tournament. William Lombardy won all eleven games, becoming the only player ever to achieve a perfect score in this tournament.

Boys U-20 – 1. William Lombardy (USA), 11/11 2. Mathias Gerusel (FRG), 9 3. Alexander Jongsma (NED), 8.5

 --- Kažić, B.M., International Championship Chess: A Complete Record of FIDE Events, Pitman Publishing, 1974, pp. 273–74. .

1959 – Münchenstein, Switzerland – (July–August) – Twenty-six players from all the populated continents competed. Bobby Fischer and Vlastimil Hort, the talented fifteen-year-old who had finished second in the Czechoslovakian championship, were not present. The players were divided into three preliminary groups, with the top four finishers from each group competing in the "Final A", a round-robin. Bielecki won with 8.5/12, two points ahead of the second-fourth-place finishers.

Boys U-20 – 1. Carlos Bielecki (ARG) 2-4. Bruno Parma (YUG), David Rumens (ENG), Josif Stefanov (BUL)

 --- Kažić, B.M., International Championship Chess: A Complete Record of FIDE Events, Pitman Publishing, 1974, p. 274. .

1961 – The Hague, Netherlands – (August–September) – Twenty-nine players competed. Raymond Weinstein of the United States had also registered, but was ruled too old to compete. The top three finishers from each of four preliminary groups qualified for Final A. Hort competed this time, scoring 4/6 to tie with three others for first place in Preliminary Group B. Unfortunately, he finished fourth on Sonneborn–Berger tiebreak, so did not qualify for Final A. Final A saw a battle between two future grandmasters, with Bruno Parma of Yugoslavia, who had tied for second the year before, beating Florin Gheorghiu in their individual game and edging out the latter by a half-point (9/11 to Gheorghiu's 8.5). The third-place finisher, Kuindzhi of the Soviet Union, scored 8 points. He beat both Parma and Gheorghiu, but lost to the last place finisher, Thomson of Scotland, who scored only two draws against the rest of the field.

Boys U-20 – 1. Bruno Parma (YUG) 2. Florin Gheorghiu (ROM) 3. Alexander Kuindzhi (USSR)

 --- Kažić, B.M., International Championship Chess: A Complete Record of FIDE Events, Pitman Publishing, 1974, pp. 275–76. .

1963 – Vrnjacka Banja, Yugoslavia – (August–September) – Thirty juniors competed in each of five preliminary groups, with the top two from each group advancing to the A Final. Once again a player who had finished second two years before became the champion, although not without difficulty. Gheorghiu of Romania and Janata tied for first with 7.5/9 scores, with Gheorghiu winning their individual game. They finished three points ahead of the third-place finisher, future grandmaster Bojan Kurajica of Yugoslavia. The match called for the tie to be broken by a four-game match, but this finished with four draws. Because Gheorghiu had the superior Sonneborn–Berger score, he was declared the champion.

Boys U-20 – 1. Florin Gheorghiu (ROM) 2. Michal Janata (CZE) 3. Bojan Kurajica (YUG)

 --- Kažić, B.M., International Championship Chess: A Complete Record of FIDE Events, Pitman Publishing, 1974, p. 277. .

1965 – Barcelona, Spain – (August–September) – Twenty-eight juniors competed in five preliminary groups, with the top two from each group advancing to the A Final. In Preliminary Group A, future grandmasters Vladimir Tukmakov and Raymond Keene tied for second with 2.5/4. Their Sonneborn–Berger scores were identical, and they had drawn their individual game, so they drew lots to break the tie. Tukmakov drew the right number to advance to the Final A. There, experience again proved helpful, with Kurajica, who had been third in Vrnjacka Banja, scoring 6.5/9 to nose out Hartoch and Tukmakov by a half-point. Future World Championship candidate Robert Hübner of West Germany finished with an even score.

Boys U-20 – 1. Bojan Kurajica (YUG) 2. Robert Hartoch (NED) 3. Vladimir Tukmakov (USSR)

 --- Kažić, B.M., International Championship Chess: A Complete Record of FIDE Events, Pitman Publishing, 1974, pp. 278–89. .

1967 – Jerusalem, Israel – (August) – The June Six-Day War made it questionable whether the tournament could be held in Israel at all, and some federations asked for it to be postponed. Although the event went ahead as scheduled, a number of countries chose not to send representatives. Only nineteen players participated, with the top three finishers from each of the three preliminary groups advancing to Final A. Julio Kaplan of Puerto Rico scored 6.5/8, a point ahead of second-place finisher Raymond Keene (who, by virtue of the drawing of lots, had missed out on Final A the previous time). Future World Championship candidate Jan Timman finished third with 5/8. Hübner scored 4.5/8 to finish fourth.

Boys U-20 – 1. Julio Kaplan (PUR) 2. Raymond Keene (ENG) 3. Jan Timman (NED)

 --- Kažić, B.M., International Championship Chess: A Complete Record of FIDE Events, Pitman Publishing, 1974, p. 280. .

1969 – Stockholm, Sweden – (August) – Thirty-eight players played in six preliminary sections, with the top two in each advancing to Final A. Among those who did not qualify for Final A was future World Championship candidate Eugenio Torre of the Philippines, who won Final B with 9/11. Final A was dominated by the rising young Soviet junior Anatoly Karpov (who would become World Champion just six years later), who gave up only two draws (10/11). András Adorján (Hungary) and Urzica (Romania) finished three points behind. The strength of the field is shown by the fact that former Champion Kaplan could only finish fourth with 6.5/11.

Boys U-20 – 1. Anatoly Karpov (USSR) 2. András Adorján (HUN) 3. Aurel Urzica (ROM)

 --- Kažić, B.M., International Championship Chess: A Complete Record of FIDE Events, Pitman Publishing, 1974, pp. 281–83. .

1971 – Athens, Greece – (July–August) – A record forty-four players from forty-three countries participated in six preliminary groups. Werner Hug of Switzerland was the surprise winner, scoring 8.5/11. Two years before, he had only finished fifth in Final C. More highly touted players finished lower: Hungarian Chess Olympiad team member and future World Championship candidate Zoltán Ribli (8/11, second); the strong American player Kenneth Rogoff (7.5/11, third); and Torre and the Soviet Grandmaster Rafael Vaganian, who were among three players scoring 7/11.

Boys U-20 – 1. Werner Hug (SWZ) 2. Zoltán Ribli (HUN) 3. Kenneth Rogoff (USA)

 --- Kažić, B.M., International Championship Chess: A Complete Record of FIDE Events, Pitman Publishing, 1974, p. 283. .

1973 – Teesside, England – (July–August) – A record fifty players from forty-eight countries competed in two preliminary Swiss-system tournaments; the top six from each qualified for Final A. The favorite, Alexander Beliavsky of the Soviet Union, won Final A with 8.5/11 despite losing to both of the English players. Tony Miles of England finished a half-point behind. There was a three-way tie for third at 7.5/11 among Michael Stean (England), Larry Christiansen (United States), and Slavoljub Marjanović of Yugoslavia, with Stean taking third on tiebreak.

Boys U-20 – 1. Alexander Beliavsky (USSR) 2. Tony Miles (ENG) 3. Michael Stean (ENG)

 --- Kažić, B.M., International Championship Chess: A Complete Record of FIDE Events, Pitman Publishing, 1974, pp. 285–86. .

1974 – Manila, Philippines – (August) – This was the first championship since the switch to an annual format. Tony Miles, who had finished second the year before, won, scoring 7/9 in the A Final. Dieks, Marjanović, and Schneider tied for second-fourth at 5.5/9.

Boys U-20 – 1. Tony Miles (ENG) 2–4. Roy Dieks (NED), S. Marjanović (YUG), Schneider (SWE)

 --- Chess Informant, Volume 18, Sahovski Informator, 1975, p. 258.

1975 – Tjentiste, Yugoslavia – (July) – Set in the mountains about 100 miles north of Dubrovnik, the small town was the scene of World War II's Battle of the Sutjeska. Dr. Max Euwe laid a wreath on the war memorial at the opening ceremony. The tournament was organised at the last minute by the Yugoslav Chess Federation after the Puerto Ricans withdrew their early offer, due to mounting financial pressure. Winner Valery Chekhov played skilfully throughout, scoring an undefeated 10-3 for a deserved victory; he had recently finished second in the Moscow senior championship. Larry Christiansen finished a half-point behind. He had a winning adjournment against the Soviet, but was less well prepared for the resumption and allowed it to fizzle out to a draw. The Englishman Jonathan Mestel managed a top three finish despite being one of the younger competitors. Ventzislav Inkiov of Bulgaria, like Mestel, scored 9–4, but due to an inferior Bucholz tie-splitting score, had to settle for fourth place. Forty-eight players took part including future grandmasters Jaime Sunye Neto and Murray Chandler. It was the first World Junior to feature a 13-round Swiss format.

Boys U-20 – 1. Valery Chekhov (USSR) 2. Larry Christiansen (USA) 3. Jonathan Mestel (ENG)

 --- CHESS magazine Vol. 41 October p. 6; Chess Informant, Vol. 20, p. 262.

1976 – Groningen, Netherlands – (December 21, 1976 – January 5, 1977) – Mark Diesen exceeded expectations, scoring 10–3 to win the event. Some credited Diesen's success to the considerable coaching and adjournment skills of his second, GM Lubomir Kavalek, who later helped Nigel Short beat Anatoly Karpov and reach a World Championship match against Garry Kasparov. This year the tournament was combined with the European Junior Chess Championship. Ľubomír Ftáčnik, who finished half a point behind Diesen, was the top-placed European and thereby became the European Junior Champion. Nir Grinberg of Israel finished third with a 9–4 score. Tied for 4th-8th places were Daniel Cámpora from Argentina, Leslie Leow from Singapore, Marcel Sisniega from Mexico and Evgeny Vladimirov from the USSR. Also in the chasing pack were Ian Rogers (AUS), Krum Georgiev (BUL), Attila Grószpéter (HUN), Jonathan Mestel (ENG), Petar Popović (YUG), Reynaldo Vera (CUB), Murray Chandler (NZL) and Margeir Petursson (ISL).

Boys U-20 – 1. Mark Diesen (USA) 2. Ľubomír Ftáčnik (CZE) 3. Nir Grinberg (ISR)

 --- British Chess Magazine No. 5, Vol. 97 p. 222; Chess Informant, Vol. 23, p. 258

1977 – Innsbruck, Austria – (September 4–19) – Artur Yusupov, a 17-year-old economics student at Moscow University, won the event with 10.5 points out of 13. Second-placed Zapata, a point behind, was also studying economics, at the University of Bogotá. Yusupov's second was the Russian IM Mark Dvoretsky and their alliance heralded the start of a long-running and mutually beneficial relationship. Marcel Sisniega of Mexico hired experienced Soviet GM Vasiukov to be his second and it may have boosted his performance, but not enough to make a difference to the medals. Petar Popović scored 8.5 points for the bronze medal. Also challenging for honours were Skembris of Greece, Fries-Nielsen of Denmark and Vera of Cuba, who lost out to Popović on tie-break.

Boys U-20 – 1. Artur Yusupov (USSR) 2. Alonso Zapata (COL) 3. Petar Popović (YUG)

 --- British Chess Magazine No. 11, Vol. 97 pp. 481–90; Chess Informant, Vol. 24, p. 264

1978 – Graz, Austria – (September 2–18) – Yusupov narrowly failed to win the tournament for a second year in succession, but could be pleased that his friend Sergei Dolmatov captured the title. Both are students of Mark Dvoretsky.

Boys U-20 – 1. Sergey Dolmatov (USSR), 10.5/13 2. Artur Yusupov (USSR), 10 3. Jens Ove Fries-Nielsen (DEN), 9

 --- British Chess Magazine No. 3, Vol. 99 p. 121; Chess Informant, Vol. 26, p. 266

1979 – Skien, Norway – (July 27 – August 10) – The first three finishers were expected to do well, but disappointing was the form of the highly rated Artur Yusupov, who only scored 7.5-5.5, tying for 12th-17th out of 56 players. Among the chasing pack were James Plaskett, Margeir Petursson, Ivan Morovic and Attila Grószpéter.

Boys U-20 – 1. Yasser Seirawan (USA), 10/13 2. Alexander Chernin (USSR), 9.5 3. Predrag Nikolić (YUG), 8.5

 --- British Chess Magazine No. 11, Vol. 99 p. 551; Chess Informant, Vol. 28, p. 291

1980 – Dortmund, Germany – 1. Garry Kasparov (URS), 10.5/13 2. Nigel Short (ENG), 9 3–5. Iván Morovic (CHI), A. Negulescu (ROM), K. Bischoff (FRG) 8.5

 --- Chess Informant, Vol. 30, p. 295

1981 – Mexico City, Mexico – 1. Ognijen Cvitan (YUG), 10.5/13 2. Jaan Ehlvest (URS), 10 3. Nigel Short (ENG), 9

 --- Chess Informant, Vol. 32, p. 311

1982 – Copenhagen, Denmark – 1. Andrei Sokolov (URS), 10/13 2. Igor Stohl (CSR), 9 3–7. Joel Benjamin (USA), Iván Morovic (CHI), Curt Hansen (DEN), Nigel Short (ENG), Milos (BRS), 8.5

 --- Chess Informant, Vol. 34, p. 346

1982 – Senta, Yugoslavia – The inaugural Girls' World Championship attracted 21 participants from 17 different countries. Agnieszka Brustman took the title with 8.5/11, a half a point ahead of Tatiana Rubzova. Maia Chiburdanidze attended the tournament as a spectator.

Girls U-20 – 1. Agnieszka Brustman (POL) 2. Tatiana Rubzova (URS) 3–4. Marta Kovacs (HUN), Biljana Verus (YUG)

 --- British Chess Magazine No. 8, Vol. 102 p. 352

1983 – Belfort, France – 1. Kiril Georgiev (BUL), 11.5/13 2. Valery Salov (URS), 10.5 3. Ahmed Saeed (UAE), 9

 --- Chess Informant, Vol. 36, p. 344

1984 – Kiljava – 1. Curt Hansen (DEN), 10.5/13  2. Alexey Dreev (URS), 10 3–4. Kiril Georgiev (BUL), Thorsteins (ISL) 9

 --- Chess Informant, Vol. 38, p. 381

1985 – Sharjah, United Arab Emirates – 1. Maxim Dlugy (USA), 10/13 2. Pavel Blatny (CZE), 9 3. Josef Klinger (AUT), 9

 --- Chess Informant, Vol. 40, p. 387

1986 – Gausdal, Norway – 1–2. Walter Arencibia (CUB), Simen Agdestein (NOR), 9.5/13 3–5. Ferdinand Hellers (SWE), Evgeny Bareev (URS), Josef Klinger (AUT), 9

 --- Chess Informant, Vol. 42, p. 400

1987 – Baguio, Philippines – 1. Viswanathan Anand (IND), 10/13 2. Vasyl Ivanchuk (URS), 9.5 3–4. Grigory Serper (URS), Patrick Wolff (USA), 9

 --- Chess Informant, Vol. 44, p. 385

1988 – Adelaide, Australia – 1–4. Joël Lautier (FRA), Vasyl Ivanchuk (URS), Grigory Serper (URS), Boris Gelfand (URS), 9/13

 --- Chess Informant, Vol. 46, p. 448

1989 – Tunja, Colombia – (August 15–31) – Due to the drug wars then raging in Colombia, some countries, including the British Chess Federation, boycotted the event. Vasil Spasov of Bulgaria was the surprise winner of the boys/open event, benefiting from a slip by his closest rival, Jacek Gdański of Poland. Gdanski managed to lose his last 2 games to throw away a 1½ point lead. Consequently, his earlier loss to Spasov was decisive in the tie-break. Sharing 3rd-5th with Swede Richard Wessman were the Soviets, Alexey Dreev and Mikhail Ulibin. Slightly off the pace were Alexei Shirov (1 point behind) and Zsuzsa Polgar (2 points behind).

Boys/Open U-20 – 1. Vasil Spasov (BUL), 9.5/13 2. Jacek Gdański (POL), 9.5 3. Richard Wessman (SWE), 9.

Girls U-20 – 1. Ketino Kachiani (USSR) 2. Ildikó Mádl (HUN) 3. Alisa Galliamova (USSR).

 --- CHESS magazine Vol 54. November p. 5; Chess Informant, Vol. 48, p. 456

1990 – Santiago, Chile – 1. Ilya Gurevich (USA), 10.5/13 2. Alexei Shirov (URS), 10.5 3. Vladimir Akopian (URS), 9.5

 --- Chess Informant, Vol. 50, p. 371

1991 – Mamaia, Romania – (August) – The tournament had to be put together in hasty fashion when the planned hosts (the Chilean Chess Federation) dropped out at the last minute. Despite this setback, the proceedings went without any serious hitch and the players appreciated the excellent conditions and sound organising skills of the Romanian officials. Hot favourites for a clean sweep in the Boys/Open U-20 event were the Soviets Vladimir Akopian, Sergei Tiviakov and Mikhail Ulibin. It turned out that all three were in good form and the medals were divided between them, following a tie-break to separate the top two. The Girls U-20 event was a two-horse race between Bojkovic of Yugoslavia and Botsari of Greece, the Yugoslav girl winning out by a half point:

Boys U-20 – 1. Vladimir Akopian (USSR), 10.5/13 2. Mikhail Ulibin (USSR), 10.5 3. Sergei Tiviakov (USSR), 8.5.

Girls U-20 – 1. Nataša Bojković (YUG), 10/13  2. Anna-Maria Botsari (GRE), 9.5 3. Maja Koen (BUL), 9.

 --- CHESS magazine Vol 56. December pp. 16-18; Chess Informant, Vol. 52, p. 364

1992 – Buenos Aires, Argentina (October) – 1. Pablo Zarnicki (ARG), 10/13 2. Vadim Milov (ISR), 10 3–8. Michelakis (SAF), O. Danielian (ARM), Dimitri Reinderman (NED), Miroslav Marković (FIDE), Egger (CHI), Rasik (CFSR), 8.5

 --- Chess Informant, Vol. 56, p. 371

1993 – Kozhikode, India – (November – December) – Top seed in the Boys / Open event, Matthew Sadler of England, led with the Czech Republic's Vlastimil Babula for much of the tournament. With both players facing top quality opposition each round, the pressure finally became too great and both failed at the final hurdle in their quest for the gold medal. Sadler also suffered from serious and frequent time trouble. This strong event contained many players who went on to become top-flight grandmasters; Alexander Onischuk, Christian Gabriel, Vladislav Tkachiev and Peter-Heine Nielsen were just four of the strong finishers not amongst the medals. Swede Jonas Barkhagen also played some enterprising chess, but was just unable to keep up with the leading group. In the Girls event, Armenian Elina Danielian, Krystina Dabrowska of Poland and Adrienn Csőke of Hungary were among those challenging for the medals. FIDE President Florencio Campomanes attended the closing ceremony and announced a new directive that assured future winners of the Boys / Open event an automatic Grandmaster title.

Boys U-20 – 1. Igor Miladinović (YUG), 9.5/13 2. Vlastimil Babula (CZE), 9 3. Sergei Rublevsky (RUS), 9.

Girls U-20 – 1. Nino Khurtsidze (GEO) 2. Ilaha Kadimova (AZE) 3. Mekhri Ovezova (TKM).

 --- CHESS magazine Vol 58. March pp. 20-22; Chess Informant, Vol. 59, p. 395

1994 – Matinhos, Brazil (November) – 1. Helgi Grétarsson (ISL), 9.5/13 2. Sofia Polgar (HUN), 9 3–7. Giovanni Vescovi (BRA), Mariano (PHI), Kumaran (ENG), Hugo Spangenberg (ARG), Ch. Gabriel (GER), 8.5

 --- Chess Informant, Vol. 61, p. 417

1995 – Halle, Germany (November–December) – There were 80 entrants in the Boys / Open section, representing nearly 70 different countries. The Girls' event had 66. Giovanni Vescovi of Brazil was another star performer in the Boys' section, narrowly missing out on a medal. The Girls' category was even more closely contested with second, third and fourth places being decided on tie-break; Natalia Zhukova was the unlucky runner-up.

Boys U-20 – 1. Roman Slobodjan (GER), 10/13 2. Alexander Onischuk (UKR), 10 3. Hugo Spangenberg (ARG), 9.5.

Girls U-20 – 1. Nino Khurtsidze (GEO) 2. Eva Repkova (SVK) 3. Corina Peptan (ROM).

 --- CHESS magazine Vol 60. March pp. 46-48; Chess Informant, Vol. 64, p. 360

1996 – Medellín, Colombia (November) – 1. Emil Sutovsky (ISR), 10/13 2–3. Zhang Zhong (CHN), Zoltan Gyimesi (HUN), 9

 --- Chess Informant, Vol. 68, p. 363

1997 – Zagan, Poland (July 13–27) – Most of the top players were able to make it, with the exception of Antoaneta Stefanova in the Girls' event; she had reportedly fallen out with the Bulgarian Chess Federation. Tal Shaked, the winner of the Open/Boys' section, secured the title on tie-break; top seed was Alexander Morozevich. Other promising young players in attendance included Vladimir Baklan, Hristos Banikas and Sergei Movsesian. In the Girls' event, Corina Peptan started as the top seed but was not in her best form. Results were as follows:

Boys U-20 – 1. Tal Shaked (USA), 9.5/13 2. Vigen Mirumian (ARM), 9.5 3. Hristos Banikas (GRE), 9.

Girls U-20 – 1. Harriet Hunt (ENG) 2. Joanna Dworakowska (POL) 3. Tatiana Vasilevich (UKR).

 --- CHESS magazine Vol 62. October pp. 28-31, 34-35; Chess Informant, Vol. 70, p. 377

1998 – Calcutta, India (November–December) – 1. Darmen Sadvakasov (KAZ), 10.5/13 2. Zhang Zhong (CHN), 9.5 3–4.Hristos Banikas (GRE), Đào Thiên Hải (VIE), 9

 --- Chess Informant, Vol. 74, p. 382

1999 – Yerevan, Armenia (November) – 1. Aleksandr Galkin (RUS), 10.5/13 2. Rustam Kasimdzhanov (UZB), 10 3–4.Karen Asrian (ARM), Lev Aronian (ARM), 9

 --- Chess Informant, Vol. 76, p. 353

2000 – Yerevan, Armenia (November) – 1. Lázaro Bruzón (CUB), 10/13 2–8. Kamil Mitoń (POL), Karen Asrian (ARM), Gershon (ISR), D. Solak (YUG), Simutowe (ZAM), Bunzmann (GER), Vladimir Malakhov (RUS), 8.5

 --- Chess Informant, Vol. 80, p. 395

2001 – Athens, Greece (August) – 1. Péter Ács (HUN), 10/13 2. Merab Gagunashvili (GEO), Lev Aronian (ARM), 9.5

 --- Chess Informant, Vol. 82, p. 355

2002 – Goa, India – 1. Lev Aronian (ARM), 10/13 2. Luke McShane (ENG) 9.5 3. Surya Sekhar Ganguly (IND) 9.0.

2003 – Nakhchivan, Azerbaijan (November) – 1. Shakhriyar Mamedyarov (AZE), 10/13 2. S. Azarov (BLR), 9.5 3–7. A. Zubov (UKR), K. Guseinov (AZE), Vugar Gashimov (AZE), V. Bachin (RUS), Erenburg (ISR), 8.5

 --- Chess Informant, Vol. 88, pp. 350-51

2004 – Kochi, India (November–December) – 1. Pendyala Harikrishna (IND), 10/13 2–3. Tigran L. Petrosian (ARM), Zhao Jun (CHN), 9.5

 --- Chess Informant, Vol. 92, p. 375

2005 – Istanbul, Turkey (November)

Boys U-20 – 1. Shakhriyar Mamedyarov (AZE), 10.5/13 2. Ferenc Berkes (HUN), 9.5 3. Evgeny Alekseev (RUS), 9

Girls U-20 – 1. Elisabeth Pähtz (GER), 10 2. Gu Xiaobing (CHN), 9.5 3. Beata Kądziołka (POL) 9.

2006 – Yerevan, Armenia (October 2–17)

Boys U-20 – 1. Zaven Andriasian (ARM), 9.5/13 2. Nikita Vitiugov (RUS), 9 3. Yuriy Kryvoruchko (UKR), 9

Girls U-20 – 1. Shen Yang (CHN), 9/13 2. Hou Yifan (CHN), 9 3. Salome Melia (GEO), 9.

2007 – Yerevan, Armenia (October)

Boys U-20 – 1. Ahmed Adly (EGY), 10/13 2. Ivan Popov (RUS), 9.5 3. Wang Hao (CHN), 9

Girls U-20 – 1. Vera Nebolsina (RUS), 10/13 2. Jolanta Zawadzka (POL), 9.5 3. Salome Melia (GEO), 9.5.

2008 – Gaziantep, Turkey (August 2–16)

Boys U-20 – 1. Abhijeet Gupta (IND), 10/13 2. Parimarjan Negi (IND), 9.5 3-7. Arik Braun (GER), David Howell (ENG), Eltaj Safarli (AZE), Hou Yifan (CHN), Bassem Amin (EGY), 9

Girls U-20 – 1. Harika Dronavalli (IND), 10.5/13 2-5. Mariya Muzychuk (UKR), Kübra Öztürk (TUR), Mary Ann Gomes (IND), Nazí Paikidze (GEO), 9.

2009 – Puerto Madryn, Argentina – 1. Maxime Vachier-Lagrave (FRA), 10.5/13  2. Sergei Zhigalko (BEL), 10.5 3. Michał Olszewski (POL) 9.

2010 – Chotowa, Poland (August 2–17)

Boys U-20 – 1. Dmitry Andreikin (RUS), 10.5 2. Sanan Sjugirov (RUS), 10 3. Dariusz Świercz (POL), 9

Girls U-20 – 1. Anna Muzychuk (SLO), 11/13 2. Olga Girya (RUS), 10.5 3. Padmini Rout (IND), 10.

2011 – Chennai, India (August 1–16)

Boys U-20 – 1. Dariusz Świercz (POL), 10.5/13 2. Robert Hovhannisyan (ARM), 10.5 3. Sahaj Grover (IND), 9.5

Girls U-20 – 1. Deysi Cori (PER), 11/13 2. Olga Girya (RUS), 10.5 3. Nazí Paikidze (GEO), 9.5.

2012 – Athens, Greece – 1. Alexander Ipatov (TUR), 10/13 2. Richárd Rapport (HUN), 10 3. Ding Liren (CHN) 9.

2013 – Kocaeli, Turkey (September 12–27)

Boys U-20 – 1. Yu Yangyi (CHN), 11/13 2. Alexander Ipatov (TUR), 10.5 3. Vidit Santosh Gujrathi (IND) 9.5.

Girls U-20 – 1. Alexandra Goryachkina (RUS), 10.5/13 2. Zhansaya Abdumalik (KAZ), 9.5 3. Alina Kashlinskaya (RUS), 9.0.

2014 – Pune, India (October 5–20) 19-year-old Lu Shanglei of China won with 10–3, edging out his countryman, 15-year-old prodigy Wei Yi; the top-rated player Vladimir Fedoseev (2661) of Russia; and Jan-Krzysztof Duda of Poland by half a point. The top finishers (on tiebreak) were:

Boys U-20 – 1. Lu Shanglei (CHN), 10/13 2. Wei Yi (CHN), 9.5 3. Vladimir Fedoseev (RUS), 9.5.

 --- New In Chess, 2014, No. 8, pp. 66, 72

See also
 World Youth Chess Championship
 European Junior Chess Championship
 European Youth Chess Championship

Notes

References

 

. (results through 1985)

External links
Chessbase.com News: results through 2004
Mark Weeks: About World Chess Championship

Junior Chess Championship
1951 in chess
1982 in chess
Recurring sporting events established in 1951
Recurring sporting events established in 1982
World youth sports competitions